Jah Is Real is a studio album by Jamaican reggae singer Burning Spear. It was released on August 19, 2008 through Burning Music. Recording sessions took place at The Magic Shop in New York City.

The album peaked at number 3 on the Reggae Albums chart in the United States. It won the Grammy Award for Best Reggae Album at the 51st Annual Grammy Awards in 2009.

Track listing

Personnel 

Winston Rodney – vocals, percussion
"Lady" Peachena Eure – backing vocals
Marie Della Thomas – backing vocals
Joanne Williams – backing vocals
The Late Show's Gospel Choir – backing vocals
Kennedy Simmonds – keyboards
William Berlind – keyboards
Lawrence Lewis – keyboards
Michael Hyde – keyboards
George Bernard Worrell, Jr. – keyboards (tracks: 2, 3, 6, 9, 11)
Brian Thorn – lead guitar, engineering
Andrew Hobby Bassford – lead guitar
Donovan McKitty – lead guitar
Cecil Ordonez – lead guitar
Ian "Beezy" Coleman – rhythm guitar
Linford Carby – rhythm guitar
David Rekhley – bass
I Palmer – bass
William Earl "Bootsy" Collins – bass (tracks: 2, 3, 6, 9)
Mr. Handgroove – bass guitar (track 14)
Howard Smith – drums
Num Heru-ur Shutef Amon'Tehu – percussion
"Blessed" Donald Toney – saxophone
Gerald "Jerry" Johnson – saxophone
Jason Jackson – trombone
Kevin Batchelor – trumpet
Donovan "Snakie" Simmonds – additional engineering
Ted Young – additional engineering
Chris Gehringer – mastering
Alexei Afonin – photography

Chart history

References

External links

2008 albums
Burning Spear albums
Grammy Award for Best Reggae Album